Kalon Barnes (born December 16, 1998) is an American football cornerback for the Minnesota Vikings of the National Football League (NFL). He played college football at Baylor.

High school career 
Barnes played wide receiver at Silsbee High School. Barnes was a three-star recruit coming out of high school and committed to play football at Baylor on May 4, 2017.

Also competing in track and field, Barnes won both the 100 metres and 200 metres at the UIL Track and Field Championships in 2017 and 2018, consecutively. He ran a wind-assisted (+3.2 m/s) 10.04 seconds in the 100 metres in 2018.

College career 
Barnes converted from wide receiver to cornerback before the 2018 season.

Professional career 
Barnes ran a 4.23-second 40-yard dash at the NFL Combine, the second-fastest time at the combine since 2003.

Carolina Panthers
Barnes was drafted by the Carolina Panthers in the seventh round (242nd overall) of the 2022 NFL Draft. He was waived on August 30, 2022.

Miami Dolphins
On September 1, 2022, Barnes was signed to the Miami Dolphins practice squad.

Minnesota Vikings
On December 14, 2022, Barnes was signed by the Minnesota Vikings from the Miami Dolphins practice squad.

References

External links
 Carolina Panthers bio
 Baylor Bears bio

1998 births
Living people
Place of birth missing (living people)
Players of American football from Texas
American football cornerbacks
Baylor Bears football players
Carolina Panthers players
Miami Dolphins players